"Manda Pama",  is a 2020 Sinhala song by Sri Lankan Singer Umaria Sinhawansa. It is pop, Arabic , R&B song. It was released as the single on July 3, 2020, through SaReGaMa Music Records. The song was written by Manuranga Wijesekara, alongside its produce Dimithri Fonseka known as DimRaaw (DimRaaw Productions) . It contains an interpolation of "Secret Love" by Manuranga who is credited as songwriters.

Manda Pama, is a super hit in Sri Lanka and song was commercial successful.The song became an internet sensation within few days since its official YouTube video release. With in 2 days it reached 2 million views on YouTube. Manda Pama is the song which reached 10 million views on YouTube in Very short time."Manda Pama" debuted at number-one on the Apple iTunes Top 100 Sri Lanka. And it was the number one song on Sri Lankan chart shows.And that time it was the most requested song in Sri Lanka.

Its accompanying music video, directed by Hasinth Pathirana from off-road pictures. The song, Manda Pama has passed 22 million views on YouTube as of September 2021.

Background and release
Sri Lankan singer Umaria has released many of her originals and she had voiced for movie playback songs, all of them are ballets and slow motion songs. She said that she likes to perform and so she need her original for that. Following the release and success of her song, Rangume (2019), On 30 June 2020, Umaria originally revealed via Instagram & YouTube that her song would be released in July  2020, and she would going to start a new beginning of her career.

After revealing that Umaria premiered the song Manda Pama on July 3, 2020, through YouTube. "Manda Pama" debuted  in the Sri Lankan TV and FM on 5 July on Sirasa TV and Sirasa FM. After Manda Pama had started to Play right across all radio channels and TV channels. The song was released via iTunes on July 6. During an interview with Hiru Fm, Umaria revealed, "'Manda Pama,' is the one of most successful thing that she have done'

Accolades

References

Sinhala-language songs
2020 songs